Hyposmocoma aspersa is a species of moth of the family Cosmopterigidae. It was first described by Arthur Gardiner Butler in 1882. It is endemic to the Hawaiian island of Oahu. The type locality is the mountains near Honolulu.

External links

aspersa
Endemic moths of Hawaii
Moths described in 1882